The Luzhou Olympic Sports Park is a public park and sports venue in Luzhou, Sichuan, China, near Southwest Medical University. The park has a multi-purpose stadium named Luzhou Olympic Sports Park Stadium with a seating capacity of 20,000, a natatorium, ten tennis courts, and athletes' apartments. Construction began in 2012, and the park and stadium were opened in 2013.

References

Football venues in China
Multi-purpose stadiums in China
Luzhou
2013 establishments in China